Scarlett Sabet (born 1 July 1989) is an English poet and performer based in London. She is the author of four poetry collections, Rocking Underground (2014), The Lock And The Key (2016), Zoreh (2018), and Camille (2019). In 2019 she released Catalyst, a spoken word album produced by Led Zeppelin guitarist Jimmy Page.

Career 

Sabet self-published her first collection Rocking Underground and gave a reading at its launch at the Chelsea Arts Club in November 2014.

She has performed at City Lights Books in San Francisco and Shakespeare & Company bookshop in Paris, where the collections The Lock and The Key was launched in July 2016. and Camille in February 2019 In March 2018, Sabet released her third collection Zoreh, launched with a reading at City Lights Books in San Francisco.

In September 2016, she read at the 25th Anniversary of the Annual Aspects Literary Festival in Belfast. Later in January 2017, Sabet gave a reading for the radio programme "Van Morrison and Me", hosted by journalist John McCarthy on the BBC World Service. In 2019, Sabet released the spoken word album Catalyst. The album was produced by Jimmy Page and made at Tower House in London.

Her poetry is influenced by Beat poets such as Jack Kerouac, William S. Burroughs, Patti Smith, Emily Dickinson, and Sylvia Plath.

Published works 
 Rocking Underground (2014)
 The Lock And The Key (2016)
 Zoreh (2018)
 Camille (2019)
 Catalyst (2019)

Personal life 
Her boyfriend is Led Zeppelin guitarist Jimmy Page. The couple have been together since 2014 and live together in West London.

References 

English women poets
1989 births
Living people
People from Surrey
21st-century English poets
Beat poetry
Spoken word poets
21st-century English women
20th-century English women
20th-century English people